The Jeweler's Shop (subtitled A Meditation on the Sacrament of Matrimony, Passing on Occasion into a Drama) is a three-act play, written in 1960 by Karol Wojtyła (later Pope John Paul II), that looks at three couples as their lives become intertwined and mingled with one another.

The play looks at humanity's ideas and expectations of romantic love and marriage. It is a truthful and animated look at the way people are when in love and their motivations for entering into couplehood.

The play

Renaissance precursor

Four centuries earlier the humanist poet Italian Cardinal Pietro Bembo authored a prose work Gli Asolani (The People of Asoli) using a similar framing device of a marriage feast to explore true love's deeper roots. Refuting a superficial analysis of subjective good vs bad experience, pithily characterized by Bembo as amare (bitter) and amore (sweet), he illustrates a third possibility. Reconciling pain and suffering with happiness and joy, human lovers can aim at the perfection of pure Platonic love, the ideal of cosmic transcendence or everlasting union. The first edition of that work was dedicated to Lucrezia Borgia at whose husband's court he had been retained. While widely read in continental Europe at the time, the work was not translated into English until 1954.

Film adaptation 
The Jeweler's Shop was adapted to the screen (La Bottega dell'orefice) by director Michael Anderson and writer Jeff Andrus in 1989 with award-winning actors Burt Lancaster and Olivia Hussey. The film's title used the English spelling "Jeweller" rather than the American "Jeweler".

External links
The Jeweler's Shop (Hardcover) at The Catholic Company
The Jeweler's Shop (Hardcover) at Amazon.com
Information on the film adaptation of the play at IMDb

Polish plays
1960 plays
Works by Pope John Paul II